The Logistic Regiment "Folgore" is a military logistics regiment of the Italian Army based in Pisa in Tuscany. Today the regiment is the logistic unit of the Paratroopers Brigade "Folgore".

History

World War II 

The history of the regiment begins with the support units of the Paratroopers Division, which was formed on 1 September 1941 in Tarquinia. On 27 July 1942 the division was renamed 185th Infantry Division "Folgore". In August of 1942 the division was sent to Libya to bolster Axis forces in the Western Desert campaign. The division participated in the last stages of the First Battle of El Alamein, Battle of Alam el Halfa, and the Second Battle of El Alamein during which the division was destroyed.

Cold War 

On 1 January 1963 the Italian Army raised the I Paratroopers Brigade in Pisa, which received the name "Folgore" on 10 June 1967.

During the 1975 army reform the army disbanded the regimental level and newly independent battalions were granted for the first time their own flags. On 1 October 1975 the Air-supplies Company "Folgore", in Pisa and the Maintenance Company "Folgore" in Livorno were merged to form the new Paratroopers Logistic Battalion "Folgore" in Pisa. On 12 November 1976 the President of the Italian Republic Giovanni Leone issued decree 846, which granted the new units their flags.

Initially the battalion consisted of a command, a command platoon, a transport and supply company, a maintenance and air supplies company, a medium workshop, and a vehicles park. In 1981 the battalion as reorganized and now consisted of a command, a command and services company, a maintenance and air supplies company, s supply company, a maintenance company, a medium transport company, and a mixed transport company. On 1 August 1986 the Maintenance and Air Supplies Company was transferred to the Military Parachute School.

On 1 September 2001 the battalion was transferred to the Logistic Projection Brigade. On 27 July 2001 the regiment was reformed as 6th Maneuver Regiment and consisted of a regimental command, a command and logistic support company, a supply battalion, a maintenance battalion, and a medical unit. On 12 September 2013 the Logistic Projection Command was disbanded and the 6th Transport Regiment returned to the Paratroopers Brigade "Folgore". On 1 July 2015 the regiment was renamed Logistic Regiment "Folgore" and reorganized as a brigade supporting logistic regiment.

Current structure 
Like all Italian Army brigade logistic regiments the Logistic Regiment "Folgore" consists of:

  Regimental Command, in Pisa
 Logistic Battalion
 Command
 Tactical Control Squad
 Supply Company
 Transport Company
 Maintenance Company
 Command and Logistic Support Company
 C3 Platoon
 Transport and Materiel Platoon
 Deployment Support Platoon
 Commissariat Platoon
 Garrison Support Unit

The Regimental Command consists of the Commandant's and Personnel Office, the Operations, Training and Information Office, the Logistic Office, and the Administration Office.

See also 
 Military logistics

External links
Italian Army Website: Reggimento Logistico "Folgore"

References 

Logistic Regiments of Italy